The Micromega 32 was a Motorola 68000-based machine running MIMOS, the French version Version 7 Unix, released in 1982 by the French company Thomson SA. It is based on the Fortune 32:16, developed by Fortune Systems Corp. The machine was presented to the public at the 1982 Salon des industries et du commerce de bureau (SICOB) in the Paris Expo Porte de Versailles.

It had a 68000 CPU clocked at 5.5 MHz and 256KB of RAM, expandable to 1MB. The display was monochrome and text based. An optional card enabled pixel graphics with a resolution of 800x480. Another expansion card added a Zilog Z80 CPU enabling the machine to run CP/M. External floppy drives or hard disks (with sizes up to 20MB) could be connected. The RS232 port could be used for network connection.

Aimed at business and government departments, it was used in French hospitals, embassies and scientific research. It was also sold in the Middle East and Algeria.

The Micromega was fundamental on the adoption of Unix by the French government, due to the localization of the Unix operating system. According to Dominique Maisonneuve, a Unix developer at CERG (Paris): "It was thanks to the Micromega that the government became interested in installing Unix. What was needed, was some hardware with a French coloring.".

Follow up models include:

 Micromega SX and Micromega SX/T – These machines have a similar box but with a different floppy drive location. The CPU is a 68000 at 11 MHz and RAM is expandable to 2 MB. It supports 45 and 70 MB hard drives and QIC-11 cartridges on the SX/T.
 Micromega 32000 – An Alcatel branded machine with a tower layout. The CPU is a 68020 at 16.5 MHz (68881 optional) with 1 to 4 MB of RAM. It features a 70MB hard drive, supports QIC-24 cartridges and offers ARCNET network connection.

References

Thomson computers
68k-based computers